Radical Traditionalism may refer to:
Within the Traditionalist School (religious studies)
An ideology advocated by Julius Evola
An ideology advocated in the Tyr journal
An album by Ralph Shapey

See also
Traditionalism (disambiguation)